Disa draconis is a species of orchid found in South Africa (SW Cape Province).

References

External links

 
 

draconis
Endemic orchids of South Africa